Xavier Casals Meseguer (born 1963) is a Spanish historian specialized in the field of the far-right.

Biography 
Born in 1963 in Barcelona, he has authored several works about the Far right, featuring studies both about the Spanish Neo-nazi and far right scene, as about an international comparative context. He has co-authored a biography of Miguel Primo de Rivera. He also has studied the phenomenon of populism.

Work 
 Neonazis en España: de las audiciones wagnerianas a los skinheads (1966-1995) (1995).
 La tentación neofascista en España (Plaza & Janés, 1998).
 Ultrapatriotas: extrema derecha y nacionalismo de la guerra fría a la era de la globalización (Crítica, 2003).
 Miguel Primo de Rivera (Ediciones de Barcelona, 2006), co-authored along Ramón Tamames.
 Ultracatalunya. L'extrema dreta a Catalunya: de l'emergència del búnker al rebuig de les mesquites (1966-2006) (L'esfera dels llibres, 2006).
 El pueblo contra el Parlamento. El nuevo populismo en España. 2009-2013 (Pasado & Presente, 2013), prologue by Enric Ucelay-Da Cal.
 La Transición española. El voto ignorado de las armas (Pasado & Presente, 2016)

References

Bibliography 
 
 
 
 
 
 
 
 

Works of Casals
 



20th-century Spanish historians
1963 births
Living people
Academics and writers on far-right extremism
Historians of the Spanish transition to democracy
21st-century Spanish historians
Writers from Barcelona